Frank Doubleday (January 28, 1945 – March 3, 2018) was an American actor whose most notable roles were as film villains.

Doubleday was born in Norwich, Connecticut and moved to Los Angeles with his family as a child.

Doubleday is known for films including John Carpenter's Assault on Precinct 13 (1976) and John Carpenter's Escape from New York (1981); in the latter of which he played the character of Romero. In the special edition Escape from New York DVD commentary, Kurt Russell credits Doubleday's performance as setting the tone of the movie.

He made his film debut in The First Nudie Musical (1976), and his other film credits include roles in Alex & the Gypsy (1976), The Big Fix (1978), Butch and Sundance: The Early Days (1979), Avenging Angel (1985), Nomads (1986), Broadcast News (1987), L.A. Bounty (1989), and Dollman (1991). Doubleday also acted and directed theater productions.

Doubleday taught acting at the Hollywood Court Theater.
 
He was married to actress Christina Hart for over 40 years. The couple had two daughters, Kaitlin Doubleday and Portia Doubleday.  Doubleday died of complications from esophageal cancer at age 73 at his Los Angeles home on March 3, 2018.

Filmography

References

External links

1945 births
2018 deaths
American male film actors
American male stage actors
American male television actors
20th-century American male actors
People from Norwich, Connecticut